Jamie Kennedy (born September 7, 1946) is a Canadian former professional ice hockey player who played 54 games for the New York Raiders of the World Hockey Association. He scored four goals and six assists for 10 points.

External links

References 

1946 births
Living people
Canadian ice hockey centres
Sportspeople from Charlottetown
New York Raiders players
Ice hockey people from Prince Edward Island
Winston-Salem Polar Twins (SHL) players